Marsh Creek is a stream in Madison County in the U.S. state of Missouri. It is a tributary of the St. Francis River.

Rock Pile Mountain lies just to the east of the confluence across the St. Francis. The historic community of Marsh Creek lies on the west bank of the St. Francis one half mile north of the confluence.

Marsh Creek derives its name from Charles S. Marsh, an early settler.

See also
List of rivers of Missouri

References

Rivers of Madison County, Missouri
Rivers of Missouri